Jaghori is one of the main districts of the Ghazni province in Afghanistan. It is located in the highlands in the southern fringes of the Hazaristan region. It occupies 1,855 km2. in the upper Arghandab valley. The population is estimated to be around 560,000 in 2015. The district capital, Sange-e-Masha, is where major business transactions take place. The district is heavily dependent on agriculture, and migrant workers as the main sources of income. Other major marketplaces are in Ghojor and Anguri.

Climate of Jaghori is generally arid continental, with cold and snowy winters, and hot summers with temperatures rising between 25 °C to 38 °C.

History 
During the period of Dost Muhammad Khan in the 1830s the area operated as part of the semi-autonomous area of Hazarajat. In 1949 Malestan District was separated from it.

During the Soviet Occupation, Maoist resistance groups were particularly active. After Harakat lost in Qarabagh District, Ghazni in 1985 to Nasr, the political organizations united to force out Hizb-e Islami from the districts of Jaghori and Malistan. However, there were only sporadic clashes here and the central government lacked interest in Jaghori. Around 1997, as the Taliban began to take control of Hazaristan the area was put under food blockade, leaving approximately 1 million Hazaras on the brink of starvation, including those in Malistan. In 1997 the elders of Jaghori avoided a Taliban attack by convening a shura in and negotiating with Taliban leaders in Kandahar, Kabul and Ghazni in order to arrange a peaceful surrender.

From 2002 to 2008 approximately 12,348 refugees repatriated through the UNHCR system, although only 181 were listed as returning in 2008 and the vast majority of repatriation occurred in 2002–04.

Security  
Head of Security General Bashi Habibullah reported intimidation has taken place by some armed groups associated with Hizb-i Wahdat which has led to some internal displacement. Members from the Nasr faction were particularly highlighted in this, and they have been accused of abductions, extortion and other crimes. Taliban presence in Ghazni has become a significant problem as well with some sources referring to the area as Taliban controlled. Aside from this the major sources of conflict are related to land and water, while debt and marriage related conflict does occur Land conflicts increased greatly during the period of drought.

In 2007 the general upsurge in violence in Afghanistan has spilled into Jaghori Zeba. Taliban militiamen from neighbouring districts have staged two attacks against district police posts and an attack on the family of the local police commander and warlord General Bashi Habibullah. On the night of 1 June 2007 over 300 Talibans attacked Jaghori district,s General Bashi Bashi Habibullah,s home, and killed Bashi Habibullah's son, nephew, wife and his personal bodyguard. There was more than 300 Taliban that night targeted General's Home town of Hudqool.( Hotqol ) ( Hutqul )
General Bashi Habibullah attacked back the Taliban during that night and managed to have killed 10 of them.

General Bashi Habib is the head of all security forces in Jaghori Zeba, brings security to the whole Jaghori Zeba city and also some parts of Ghazni provinces.

The Taliban has also issued warning night-letters to villagers in the district, but with General Bashi Habibullah presence in the Area the taliban has only managed to use snipers to get any info regarding the General.

The security situation in other parts of the province has greatly affected the livelihood of the inhabitants, posing serious threats to their life, security and freedom. The districts are inaccessible except through Taliban territory, where the road has been reportedly mine and in some areas vehicles have been banned. According to some reports the road from Qarabagh District to Jaghouri, passing through Malestan is under particular threat, with kidnappings and up to 150 cars having been stolen. There are also concerns that the Taliban will use the Kuchi nomads to exert their influence in the region.
General Bashi Habibullah has Army Check points between Rasna, Gilan connecting Jaghori Zeba, Gardo HotqoL. He also controls all near by borders including Ajeristan, qarabagh, Malistan and many more near by villages.

During the 2007 attack which took place right at the midnight then over 200 Talibans attacked General Bashi Habibullah's home city of Hotqol Jaghori Zeba, killed his bodyguards, sons nephew, wife. General Bashi Habibullah managed and killed over 10 of those talibans until 3 o'clock morning, there was no help from the Afghan national government or from Ghazni province.

2018 
On 7 November 2018 the Taliban launched an offensive in the Jaghori District. Heavy fighting was reported around the village of Hotqol over 800 talibans attacked General Bashi Habibullah Khan Jaghori's security posts bordering Hotqul and Rasna Gilan. General Habibullah lost his life along with his three sons. The fighting continued for over two weeks and over seventy people lost their lives. Taliban humiliatingly retreated from Hotqol. More than 200 Taliban members were killed and more than 150 others were wounded. According to some reports more than 3000 Taliban militias were deployed in south of Jaghori. Most of these militias were recruited in regions along Pak-Afghan border. People of Jaghori resisted and repelled Taliban offence without any assistance from the government. 
The Talibans took all valuable stuffs then bombed General Bashi Habibullah Khan's home.

Education 
Jaghori has one of the highest literacy rate among other provinces in Afghanistan. 
Jaghori has in the past decades produced the largest number of students to qualify for a place in the Kabul University and other universities in Afghanistan. The new trend towards learning and education has come as a reaction against what people went through during the decades of factional, tribal, ethnic and religious conflicts.

Currently there are 92 High Schools, and hundreds of smaller primary and middle schools in the district but there are no signs of other infrastructure such as roads, electricity, water or gas. The people produce electricity on their own by using diesel engines during the night (normally from 6 to 8 PM during winter or 7 to 9 PM during summer). Many people use Solar energy and those close to river use turbines to produce electricity. As of 2008 there were no reports of closures of schools due to security.

Jaghori has a population of more than 650,000 residents of mainly Hazara ethnic living there.

Economy, agriculture and development 
According to information from the United Nations Food Program for Afghanistan in 2003 and the Ministry for Rural Rehabilitation and Development in 2007, the main crops in the area are wheat, corn, maize, peas, vetch, beans, almonds, walnuts, mulberries, grapes, tobacco, potatoes, onions, apples, apricots and herbs.

60 Community Development Committees were reportedly active in Malistan in 2008.

In years following the fall of the Taliban the area has been particularly affected by drought. In combination with frequent attacks along the Kabul-Kandahar Ring Road, this has seriously affected aid and development in the system and exacerbated local conflicts.

from 2010 to 2018 Mr.Zafar Sharif the Governor of Jaghori District worked extremely hard toward education and health for the people of Jaghori District.

Politics 
Past and present major political parties include Muttahed-e-Inqelab-e-Islami Afghanistan (formed 1981), Hizbullah, Nahzat-e-Islami, Sazman-e-Nasr-e-Afghanistan, Pasdaran-e-Jihad-e Islami Afghanistan (formed 1983) and Hezb-e-Wahdat (Nasr faction), the later controlling the district since 2001–2008, although as of 2009 the Taliban have begun to exert their influence. Specifically Khalili's faction is known to be particularly strong.

Significant villages 
 Badrazar

See also 
 Districts of Afghanistan
 Hazarajat
 Jaghori (Hazara tribe)

References

External links 
 Jaghori district on OpenStreetMap (relation)
UNHCR District Profile

 
Districts of Ghazni Province
Hazarajat